Fernando Lecuona (20 October 1926 – 2 January 2020) was a Cuban gymnast who competed in the 1948 Summer Olympics.

References

1926 births
2020 deaths
Cuban male artistic gymnasts
Olympic gymnasts of Cuba
Gymnasts at the 1948 Summer Olympics
Pan American Games gold medalists for Cuba
Pan American Games silver medalists for Cuba
Pan American Games bronze medalists for Cuba
Pan American Games medalists in gymnastics
Gymnasts at the 1951 Pan American Games
Medalists at the 1951 Pan American Games
20th-century Cuban people
21st-century Cuban people